Dennis "Denny" Urban (born June 28, 1988) is an American professional ice hockey player who is currently playing for the Straubing Tigers of the Deutsche Eishockey Liga (DEL).

Playing career
During the 2012–13 season while in his third season with the Reading Royals in the ECHL. Urban made his AHL debut with the Worcester Sharks. On February 1, 2013, he was signed for the remainder of the campaign with Worcester and contributed with 17 points in 36 games from the Blueline.

On July 16, 2013, Urban was signed as a free agent by the San Antonio Rampage to a one-year contract. In the 2013–14 season, Urban appeared in 30 games with the Rampage for just 8 assists before he was traded to fellow AHL club, the Springfield Falcons, in exchange for Tim Miller on February 20, 2014.

On July 14, 2015, Urban left the North American minor leagues to sign his first contract abroad with German club, Straubing Tigers of the DEL.

Career statistics

Awards and honors

References

External links

1988 births
American men's ice hockey defensemen
Ice hockey players from Pennsylvania
Kalamazoo Wings (ECHL) players
Living people
Reading Royals players
Robert Morris Colonials men's ice hockey players
San Antonio Rampage players
Springfield Falcons players
Worcester Sharks players